Paul Atkins may refer to:

 Paul Atkins (cinematographer), American cinematographer
 Paul Atkins (rugby league), former New Zealand rugby league player
 Paul S. Atkins, former commissioner of the U.S. Securities and Exchange Commission
 Paul Atkins (cricketer) (born 1966), English cricketer
 Paul Atkins (Australian footballer) (born 1968), former Australian rules footballer